Udta Punjab is a 2016 Indian crime drama film written and directed by Abhishek Chaubey, co-written by Sudip Sharma, and produced by Shobha Kapoor, Ekta Kapoor, Sameer Nair and Aman Gill under Balaji Motion Pictures in association with Anurag Kashyap, Vikas Bahl and Vikramaditya Motwane under Phantom Films. Loosely based on and revolving around the drug abuse by the youth population in the Indian state of Punjab and the various conspiracies surrounding it, the film stars Shahid Kapoor, Alia Bhatt, Kareena Kapoor and Diljit Dosanjh. 

On 4 June 2016, the Central Board of Film Certification, India sought a stay on the film's release citing that the themes dealt with in the film were too vulgar for the general audience. As a result, the producers were directed to make a total of 89 cuts in the film. However, on 13 June 2016, the Bombay High Court struck down the stay and gave permission for the film's national release, albeit with a single cut in the screenplay. The film was released worldwide on 17 June 2016. It received positive reviews from critics, with praise for its direction, story, screenplay, music and performances of the cast. 

At the 62nd Filmfare Awards, Udta Punjab received a leading 9 nominations, including Best Film, Best Director (Chaubey), Best Actor (Shahid Kapoor), Best Supporting Actress (Kareena Kapoor) and Best Supporting Actor (Dosanjh), and won 4 awards including Best Actress (Bhatt) and Best Actor (Critics) (Shahid Kapoor).

Plot 
Three Pakistani youth throw packets of drugs across the border to India for it to be picked up later. Tejinder "Tommy" Singh, better known as "Gabru" among his fans, is a young and successful Punjabi musician who lives a luxurious lifestyle. Together with an ostentatious crew led by Tayaji and cousin Jassi, he routinely indulges in cocaine consumption. Tommy is popular for his energetic songs with lyrics that often glorify violence and drug addiction. However, his addiction costs him his music contract and lands him in jail. While in prison, he meets two of his die-hard fans who remark how Tommy's lifestyle had 'inspired' theirs, leading them to murder their own mother for drug money. Realizing that his songs have negatively affected teenagers, Tommy decides to change his ways upon release. A few days later, he engages in an altercation and inadvertently shoots Tayaji, injuring his ear. This causes Tayaji to send Tommy and his crew away to a farmhouse so that he can prepare for an upcoming concert.

Working on the farm is a migrant worker from Bihar nicknamed Bauria, whose dreams of playing national-level hockey for the country were shattered due to her father's death, pushing her to Punjab to work as a laborer. She works for a local landlord who uses agriculture as a front for drug-peddling. One night, she finds a suspicious packet on the farm and realizes that it is some kind of a drug. She resolves to sell it but her search for a potential buyer lands her in trouble as she unwittingly contacts the original owners of the heroin. She is captured by the gang of drug peddlers but not before she discards it into a well. As a compensation for their lost drugs, the peddlers forcibly keep her at their house, where she is sexually and physically abused, given drugs, and pimped to men. Some weeks later, she manages to escape.

Over in the neighboring town lives Preet Sahni, a doctor and activist who runs a rehabilitation center. Sartaj Singh is a junior policeman who knows about the drug smuggling his seniors are allowing on a large scale. But when it affects his family, as his brother, Balli, overdoses and is brought to Preet's clinic, he realizes the grave situation. Preet and Sartaj decide to find the root cause of the problem together. Balli is admitted into her drug rehabilitation centre against his will.

At his concert, instead of singing, Tommy starts preaching. Infuriated by his speech about how one should lead one's life, his fans start throwing bottles at him. The angered Tommy urinates in front of the crowd before fleeing. He hides in an old structure and meets Bauria, also hiding. The two share their stories and bond. However, Bauria is recaptured by the same gang when she defends Tommy from being attacked by them. He learns the next day that an arrest warrant has been issued for him because of the public ruckus at the concert, and sets out to find Bauria after realising his feelings for her.

Preet and Sartaj find that the driving force behind the drug problem in Punjab is an elderly man called Virender Singh, who has flourished with the support of his father-in-law, MP Maninder Brar. The two go to extreme measures to collect evidence against the politician and put together a report to be sent to the state's Election Commission to thwart Brar's campaign for another term in power. Sartaj and Preet fall in love; however, one night, Preet sees a manic Balli trying to escape from her rehab center. On trying to stop him, she is accidentally stabbed in the neck by him. As Balli is Sartaj's brother, senior officer Jhujar Singh who investigates the homicide decides to send him underground. While falsifying the crime scene he comes across the report made by her and Sartaj, and is infuriated when he sees that he too has been named in the drug racket. He calls Sartaj and knocks him out when he arrives.

Waking up in the presence of the local drug mafia at their farmhouse, where Bauria is also confined, a bruised and beaten Sartaj is questioned by Jhujar, who is a key member in the drug racket. Sartaj says whatever he did was for the sake of Punjab. At the same time, Tommy enters the house, armed with a hockey stick. Taking advantage of the distraction, Sartaj grabs Jhujar's gun and shoots the whole gang before freeing Balli. Tommy helps Bauria escape from her captors. Balli kneels and cries in front of his brother, whose face is expressionless.

Eventually, it is shown that the government issued an inquiry into Brar's activities and there has been a huge crackdown on the drug menace. Over in Goa, amidst his crew members, Tommy calls Bauria to ask for her real name. Sitting by the beach, she catches sight of a foreigner having fun. Inspired, she says "Mary Jane", to which Tommy flirtatiously replies that she is his "life", and she ends the call before going for a swim.

Cast 
 Shahid Kapoor as Tejinder "Tommy" Singh a.k.a. Gabru
 Alia Bhatt as Bauria a.k.a. Mary Jane.
 Kareena Kapoor as Dr. Preet Sahni
 Diljit Dosanjh as ASI Sartaj Singh
 Satish Kaushik as Tayaji, Jassi's father
 Suhail Nayyar as Jassi, Tayaji's son and Tommy's cousin
 Prabhjyot Singh as Balli Singh
 Jaswinder Kaur as Sartaj's mother
 Manav Vij as Jhujar Singh, Sartaj's senior officer
 Mahabir Bhullar as Veerji
 Ishaan Khatter in a cameo appearance

Planning and filming 
Priyanka Chopra was initially approached for the lead female role. Later Parineeti Chopra was in talks for the same part. Principal photography of the film commenced in March 2015, Three of the actors Shahid Kapoor, Kareena Kapoor and Alia Bhatt halved their fees for the film.

Music 

The music for Udta Punjab was composed by Amit Trivedi with lyrics by the late Shiv Kumar Batalvi, Shellee and Varun Grover. The background music was composed by Benedict Taylor & Naren Chandavarkar. The music rights are acquired by Zee Music Company.

The first song "Chitta Ve" was released on 4 May 2016. Two more singles "Da Da Dasse" and "Ik Kudi" were released before the Release of the final soundtrack. The complete soundtrack consisting of 7 songs was released on 18 May 2016.

Track listing

Production 
Amit Trivedi said about the soundtrack, "The film required a really dark soundtrack. So, I had to incorporate psychedelic trance and hip hop into it. It will be edgier and more in-your-face than anything else seen in Bollywood music before. I don't know how the audience will react to it because it is not something that we are used to. But I do know that there are people who have an appetite for psy-trance and hip hop in India. So, I hope it is received well".

Release 

The movie has been reported to have had issues with the censor board over profanities and scenes of drug use. On 9 June 2016, the Censor Board (CBFC) came out with a list of 94 cuts and 13 pointers prior to the film's release. One of the pointers even included deleting the names of cities in Punjab. On 13 June 2016, Bombay High Court cleared Udta Punjab with one cut and disclaimers. The scene where Tommy Singh (Shahid Kapoor) is shown urinating on a crowd needs to be chopped off, ruled the court. The CBFC was directed to issue an 'A' certificate to Udta Punjab within two days.

Censorship issues 
The row over the film being drug-themed slated for release on 17 June escalated with co-producer Anurag Kashyap hitting out at CBFC chief Pahlaj Nihalani, calling him "oligarch" and "dictator" and that it was like living in North Korea. The makers of the film are said to have been asked by the Revising Committee of the Censor Board to remove all references to Punjab and to make 89 cuts. Kashyap got the support of several filmmakers including Karan Johar, Mahesh Bhatt, Ram Gopal Varma, Aamir Khan, Imtiaz Ali, Varun Dhawan and Mukesh Bhatt. "It is a dark day for freedom of expression and creativity in the country," Mukesh Bhatt said, calling Pahlaj Nihalani a "stooge" of the government.
It was later cleared by Bombay High Court with the number of cuts reduced from 89 to a single scene, wherein a character is seen urinating on a crowd of people. The Court directed the Board to issue an 'A' certificate before the scheduled release of the movie. According to The Economist, Nihalani "was appointed by the BJP, whose coalition partner in Punjab, the SAD, had much to lose from bad publicity" resulting from the movie, due to a subplot in the movie drawing "a parallel with the real-life case of a convicted drug lord who named the SAD deputy chief’s brother-in-law as his accomplice".

In August 2017, soon after his removal as CBFC Chief, Nihalani revealed in an interview that he had received instructions from the Ministry of Information and Broadcasting to block the release of the film.

Online piracy issue 
On 15 June 2016, some parts of the film were leaked online onto various peer-to-peer sharing websites. While some torrent sites hosted torrent files containing a forty-minute clip, the whole film was also uploaded on other media sharing sites like Mega. Indiatimes.com reported that the leaked clips allegedly contained the text "FOR CENSOR" on the top-left corner, implying that the leaked copies were part of the samples shared with the Censor Board. The Huffington Post reported that the producers of the film had filed a complaint with the Cyber Crime cell in Mumbai. It added that Balaji Motion Pictures and Phantom Films, its producers, had succeeded in pulling down as many as 600 links from the web. Commenting on the leak, the film's spokesperson said, "Two copies of the CD were sent to the CBFC and this version is from the same source. It's literally a no-brainer to conclude where the leak has come from and, sure enough, the cyber crime cell will get to the bottom of this."

Reception 
Udta Punjab was acclaimed by critics. Meena Iyer of The Times of India gave the film 4.5 stars out of 5. Rajeev Masand of News18 writes "the film is hard-hitting and uncomfortable to watch, and mixes dark humor to a tale about the dirty drug and political nexus in Punjab", giving it 3.5 rating out of 5. Shubhra Gupta of The Indian Express gave the film 3 stars out of 5, saying it is "the kind of film which has something to say, and it says it with both flair and conviction". Sukanya Verma of Rediff.com gave the film 4 stars out of 5, saying "Udta Punjab is a wake-up call, an important film and a mighty impressive one at that, carrying a loud anti-drug message". Rohit Vats of Hindustan Times wrote "Udta Punjab works mostly because of its tone and stand against drugs, though the second half is no match for the first", giving the film 3.5 rating out of 5. Saibal Chatterjee of NDTV gave the film 4 stars out of 5, writing "Udta Punjab is littered with standout scenes, but none matches the sledgehammer impact of the climax". Namrata Joshi of The Hindu described the film as "a gut-wrenching look at the frightening dystopia that is Punjab today owing to rampant drug abuse".

The film was banned in Pakistan by CBFC Pakistan for "use of abusive language."

Box office 
The film was a commercial success, and became Shahid Kapoor's largest-opening film at the time. The film grossed  worldwide during its opening weekend and  worldwide in its first week. , the film has earned 15 crore (US$16.6 million) worldwide.

Accolades

Notes

References

External links 

 
 
 

2010s crime films
Punjabi-language Indian films
2010s Hindi-language films
Balaji Motion Pictures films
Films about cocaine
Films about drugs
Films about heroin addiction
Films about organised crime in India
Films about prostitution in India
Films about the illegal drug trade
Films set in Punjab, India
Indian crime drama films
Indian crime films
Films about the Narcotics Control Bureau